Sir Nicholas Slanning (1 September 1606 - August 1643) was a soldier and landowner from Devon who sat in the House of Commons from 1640 to 1642. He served in the Royalist army during the First English Civil War and was mortally wounded at Bristol on 26 July 1643.

A member of a wealthy family with extensive estates in Devon and Cornwall, Slanning gained military experience in the Thirty Years' War and was appointed Vice Admiral of South Cornwall and Governor of Pendennis Castle in 1635. He served in the 1639 and 1640 Bishops' Wars and was elected MP for Penryn in the Long Parliament, where he consistently supported Charles I.

Following the outbreak of the Civil War in August 1642, he raised a regiment of infantry from his estates in Cornwall and played a prominent role in the 1643 Western campaign, which ensured Royalist control of South West England. Badly wounded in assaulting Bristol on 26 July, he died three weeks later.

Personal details
Nicholas Slanning was born 1 September 1606 in Hele, Devon, only son of Gamaliel Slanning (1589–1612) and Margaret Marler, his second cousin; they also had an elder daughter, Elizabeth. His father's early death meant at the age of six he inherited substantial estates around Plymouth and Falmouth, including Maristow, Bickleigh, Walkhampton and Roborough.

He married Gertrude Bagge (1614–1691) in 1625 and they had three children, Elizabeth (1630–1734), Margaret (died 1682) and Nicholas (1643–1691). Two years after his death, Gertrude married Richard Arundell, 1st Baron Arundell of Trerice, who served with Slanning during the First English Civil War.

Career
Slanning attended Exeter College, Oxford before entering the Inner Temple in 1628 to acquire the legal training considered essential for members of the gentry at the time. He spent the next three years serving in the Dutch States Army, then considered the best place to learn the 'art of war' due to its success in the Eighty Years' War against Spain. Many officers on both sides during the Wars of the Three Kingdoms did the same, including Sir Thomas Fairfax and George Monck. 

After returning to England, Slanning was knighted on 24 August 1632 at Nonsuch Palace. He was appointed to the Commission for Piracy in Devon and Cornwall, Vice-Admiral of Cornwall and Governor of Pendennis Castle, a relatively modern fortification constructed by Henry VIII that guarded the entrance to Falmouth harbour. These were important positions, since the port was commonly used by foreign merchant ships seeking shelter, while Barbary pirates operated in the waters off Land's End.

Shortly before the first of the Bishops' Wars in February 1639, Slanning was ordered to take men and artillery from Pendennis and garrison Carlisle Castle. This was intended to support a Royalist landing from Ulster which failed to take place and instead, Slanning joined the main force in Newcastle. According to Sir Bevil Grenville, he was given command of a company of infantry which served as a bodyguard to Charles I.      

Having failed to defeat the Scots, Charles recalled Parliament for the first time since 1629, in order to raise money for another attempt. In April 1640, Slanning was elected to the Short Parliament as MP for Plympton Erle. Charles dissolved it after less than a month and Slanning served in the second Bishops' War, which again ended in defeat. The financial penalties imposed by the Treaty of Ripon could only be paid for by new taxes approved by Parliament, forcing Charles to call new elections.   

In November, Slanning was elected for both Plympton Erle and Penryn to the Long Parliament but chose to sit for Penryn. He consistently supported the Crown and in May 1641 was one of the fifty-nine MPs named as "betrayers of their country" for voting against the Bill of Attainder for Strafford. Other MPs who voted against the Bill included Sidney Godolphin, John Trevanion and John Arundel, all of whom would later be killed fighting for the Royalists. He was given permission in June to return to Pendennis Castle but in January 1642 was summoned to attend Parliament for allegedly authorising the arrest of the "Five Members", should they try to embark from a Cornish port, a charge he denied. The majority of Royalist MPs withdrew from Parliament in April and he was certainly in Cornwall on 9 August when he was barred from the Commons as a "delinquent".

First English Civil War

As tensions mounted, Slanning used his position in Falmouth to import military supplies for the Royalist cause. When the First English Civil War broke out in August 1642, he began raising troops in Cornwall. He, Grenville, William Godolphin, Trevanion and Warwick Mohun recruited five regiments collectively known as "the Tinners", since many came from local tin mines controlled by Slanning and Godolphin. 

Although regarded as some of the best infantry available to the Royalists, the rank and file often had little choice in deciding whether to "volunteer"; Grenville, generally regarded as a benevolent landlord, threatened his tenants and employees with sanctions if they refused to sign up. In addition, while militia on both sides often refused to serve outside their own counties, the Cornish were particularly noted for their reluctance to serve outside Cornwall or under non-Cornish officers, factors which later limited their usefulness.   

In October, Slanning relinquished his position as Governor of Pendennis and joined the field army assembled by Sir Ralph Hopton for an unsuccessful attack on Exeter. After victory at Braddock Down in January 1643, Hopton moved against Plymouth but many of the Cornish troops refused to cross the River Tamar into Devon. The Royalists were very short of basic supplies like gunpowder and ammunition and on 21 February were routed by Parliamentarian troops at Modbury; Slanning's regiment suffered over 350 killed, wounded or captured. 

The two sides agreed a local truce, an agreement greeted with incredulity by William Waller, Parliamentarian commander in the West. Hopton used the opportunity to reorganise his army, while Slanning brought his unit back up to full strength and they resumed the offensive after the truce ended in April. Although repulsed at Sourton Down on 25 April, the Royalists won a resounding victory at Stratton on 16 May, Slanning and Trevanion commanding the left flank of their attack. Having linked up with Prince Maurice, they advanced into Somerset and defeated Waller first at Landsdowne on 5 July, then Roundway Down eight days later. These victories ensured Royalist control of South West England but the Cornish foot suffered heavy casualties, including Grenville who was killed at Lansdowne.

Recognising an opportunity to capture Bristol, then the second-largest port in England, Prince Rupert left Oxford and on 23 July met up with Prince Maurice and the Western Army outside the city. Early on the morning of 26 July, simultaneous attacks were made by Prince Rupert's men in the north while Prince Maurice assaulted the stronger southern defences. Although the northern attack was successful, the Cornish were repulsed three times and lost over 200 combatants, including many senior officers. Trevanion died of his wounds the same night, Slanning "had his thigh broken with a case shot, whereof he dyed three weeks later".

References

Sources
 
 
 
 
 
 
 
 
 
 
  
 
 
 
 

1606 births
1643 deaths
People killed in the English Civil War
Military personnel from Devon
Members of the Inner Temple
Alumni of Exeter College, Oxford
Members of the pre-1707 English Parliament for constituencies in Cornwall
English MPs 1640 (April)
English MPs 1640–1648
Members of the Parliament of England for Plympton Erle
Royalist military personnel of the English Civil War
People from Mid Devon District
English justices of the peace